Alvord is a surname. Notable people with the surname include:

Austin D. Alvord (born 1843), American politician
 Benjamin Alvord (mathematician) (1813–1884), American soldier, mathematician, and botanist
 Benjamin Alvord Jr. (1860–1927), son of the above, American soldier, U.S. general during World War I
Billy Alvord (1863–1927), American baseball player
Burt Alvord, an Arizona marshal and later outlaw
Edith Vosburgh Alvord (1875–1962), American suffragist
Henry Elijah Alvord (1844–1904), American university administrator and educator
James C. Alvord (1808–1839), U.S. Representative from Massachusetts
Lori Alvord (born 1958), American doctor
Thomas G. Alvord (1810–1897), American lawyer, merchant and politician
Tiffany Alvord (born 1992), singer/songwriter and YouTube celebrity
William Alvord (1833–1904) American merchant, banker and political leader